Synclera univocalis, the jujube leaf-folder, is a moth of the family Crambidae described by Francis Walker in 1859. It is found on the Chagos Archipelago and Sri Lanka. Records from India, Burma, Yemen, Palestine, Syria and South Africa refer to other species in the genus.

The larvae feed on Zizyphus mauritiana.

External links

Behavioral studies of the mobile forms of Synclera univocalis on jujube, Ziziphus mauritiana

Moths described in 1859
Spilomelinae